Saveur is an online gourmet, food, wine, and travel magazine that publishes essays about various world cuisines. The publication was co-founded by Dorothy Kalins, Michael Grossman, Christopher Hirsheimer, and Colman Andrews who was also the editor-in-chief from 1996 to 2001. It was started by Meigher Communications in 1994. World Publications bought Saveur and Garden Design in 2000. World Publications was renamed Bonnier Corporation in 2007. A popular feature is the "Saveur 100", an annual list of "favorite restaurants, food, drink, people, places and things".

History
Saveur was created by Dorothy Kalins, then editor-in-chief of Metropolitan Home magazine. Kalins launched the new food magazine with Christopher Hirsheimer (who produced food stories for Metropolitan Home) and Colman Andrews (who wrote a column for that magazine). Kalins served as Saveurs founding editor-in-chief, with Michael Grossman as creative director, Andrews as executive editor, and Hirsheimer as food editor. Saveur was originally published six times a year by Meigher Communications, a now-defunct publishing company founded by Chris Meigher, a former Time Inc. executive. Saveur has always been based in New York City.

Saveurs first issue hit the stands in the summer of 1994 with a 13-page cover story about the famed moles of Oaxaca, Mexico, complete with photos from the region's food markets and home kitchens, and a step-by-step visual guide to making chicken and mole-filled tamales. That inaugural issue also included a piece about a mail-order source for freshly milled flour from Kansas, a piece on beer made by Trappist monks in Belgium, and a behind-the-scenes look at a pizza trade show in Las Vegas. "Do you see the world food first?" Kalins wrote in her first First column, the magazine's letter from the editor. "We think it's time for a new kind of food magazine—one that reconnects us with the ingredients, the process, the true satisfaction of food. We think it's time to stop and smell the rosemary."

Kalins departed Saveur in 2000 after the magazine was purchased by World Publications, a special interest magazine company based in Winter Park, Florida. Under World Publications the magazine was published eight times a year. Andrews served as in editor-in-chief until 2006; he departed shortly after Bonnier, the Swedish media company, purchased a minority stake in World Publications.

James Oseland, a regular Saveur writer who was brought on by Andrews as executive editor, became editor-in-chief in 2006. Oseland, whose first cookbook, Cradle of Flavor: Home Cooking from the Spice Islands of Indonesia, Singapore, and Malaysia, was published in 2006, built a new editorial team. While hewing to the magazine's original mission, the new editors welcomed a growing readership with special feature packages and single-topic issues—from The World of Butter (March 2008) to The Glories of Greece (August 2010)—each of which tackled a single theme in depth. These themed packages and issues included not only recipes and techniques, but also multiple narratives, providing diverse perspectives on each topic of focus. Essayists, novelists, comedians, and others have turned to the subject of food in the pages of Saveur: In the magazine's October 2010 25 Great Meals issue, Rita Mae Brown wrote of a meal she shared with her grandfather's hunting dogs; Dean Koontz, about sharing sandwiches with his uncle; Marc Maron, about cooking Thanksgiving dinner for his calorie-conscious mother.

In 2014, the editors of Saveur published Saveur: The New Classics Cookbook. Contributors included James Oseland and Helen Rosner.

In February 2021, Saveur announced they were ceasing physical publication in favor of an online-only presence.

Blog awards
In 2010, Saveur opened nominations for the inaugural "Best Food Blog Awards" in nine categories. In 2011, readers voted for their favorite food blogs in 17 categories, including Best Food Photography, Best Regional Cuisine Blog, and Best Kitchen Tools and Hardware Coverage. 2014 was the first year featuring "Reader's Choice" and "Editor's Choice" winners. The 2015 awards honored 78 blogs in 13 categories. The winners of Saveur awards include David Lebovitz, Deb Perelman, Molly Yeh, Joy Wilson, and Michał Korkosz.

Circulation
Saveur claimed a circulation of 325,000 subscribers, and Saveur.com reported to have 2 million unique visitors monthly.

References

Bonnier Group
Eight times annually magazines published in the United States
Food and drink magazines
Lifestyle magazines published in the United States
Magazines established in 1994
Magazines published in New York City
Nine times annually magazines
Online magazines published in the United States
Online magazines with defunct print editions
Tourism magazines